Cephaleuros is a genus of parasitic thalloid green algae comprising approximately 14 species.  Its common name is red rust. Specimens can reach around 10 mm in size. Dichotomous branches are formed.  The alga is parasitic on some important economic plants of the tropics and subtropics such as tea, coffee, mango and guava causing damage limited to the area of algal growth on leaves (algal leaf spot), or killing new shoots, or disfiguring fruit.  Members of the genera may also grow with a fungus to form a lichen that does not damage the plants.

Species 
The  species currently recognised are:
Cephaleuros biolophus
Cephaleuros diffusus
Cephaleuros drouetii
Cephaleuros endophyticus
Cephaleuros expansa
Cephaleuros henningsii
Cephaleuros karstenii
Cephaleuros lagerheimii
Cephaleuros minimus
Cephaleuros parasiticus
Cephaleuros pilosa
Cephaleuros solutus
Cephaleuros tumidae-setae
Cephaleuros virescens

References

External links 
 Images of Cephaleuros at Algaebase

Trentepohliaceae
Ulvophyceae genera